Veensgarth (Viking farm, or Vingarðr, Meadow Farm), is a village in the Tingwall valley west of Lerwick on Mainland in Shetland, Scotland. It includes the Vallafield housing estate. Veensgarth is also within the parish of Tingwall, and is situated at the junction of the A970 and the B9074.

References

External links

Canmore - Veensgarth, Veensgarth House, Steading site record

Villages in Mainland, Shetland